Ingvald Tøndel (7 January 1887 – 28 September 1952) was a Norwegian politician for the Christian Democratic Party.

He was born in Lensvik (west coast of norway)

He was elected to the Norwegian Parliament from Sør-Trøndelag in 1945, and was re-elected on one occasion. During his second term, he died and was replaced by Johannes Wigum.

Tøndel was a member of Hemne municipality council between 1922 and 1924, and then served as mayor from 1924 to 1934. After World War II he returned as deputy mayor in 1947-1951. Between 1941 and 1949 he was a member of the Diocese Council of Nidaros.

References

1887 births
1952 deaths
Christian Democratic Party (Norway) politicians
Members of the Storting
Mayors of places in Sør-Trøndelag
People from Hemne
Norwegian Lutherans
20th-century Norwegian politicians
20th-century Lutherans